Novokuybyshevsk is a city in Samara Oblast, Russia, located on the eastern bank of the Volga River,  away from it. Population:

History
During the Russian Civil War, the area where the city now stands was a place of ferocious battles with the White Russians.

In 1946, shortly after World War II, the Soviets constructed an oil refinery in Novokuybyshevsk, which resulted in the establishment of a large village of approximately 14,000 people. The location soon turned out to be so advantageous that the government decided to develop the village into a major industrial center. In September 1951, the first working refineries started operating, on February 22, 1952, following the decision of the Presidium of the Supreme Soviet of the RSFSR, Novo-Kuybyshev was granted town status and renamed Novokuybyshevsk.

Administrative and municipal status
Within the framework of administrative divisions, it is, together with seven rural localities, incorporated as the city of oblast significance of Novokuybyshevsk—an administrative unit with the status equal to that of the districts. As a municipal division, the city of oblast significance of Novokuybyshevsk is incorporated as Novokuybyshevsk Urban Okrug.

Economy
In the city the petrochemical, presented three refineries Rosneft company, as well as plants such as Petrochemicals, Samaraorgsintez, Novokuibyishevsk Refinery.

References

Notes

Sources

Cities and towns in Samara Oblast